1788-L is an electronic music producer. He rose to fame in 2018 with a remix of Virtual Self's "Particle Arts" uploaded onto his SoundCloud account. Other releases following this include "Multiverse" (with 4AM) and a remix of Daft Punk's "Rinzler".

Career
On 26 January 2018, 1788-L uploaded his debut release, "Replica", on SoundCloud. A digital download release of his song was issued on 2 February 2018. On 9 February 2018 he released a remix of "Particle Arts" by Virtual Self. On 2 March 2018, a remix of Daft Punk's "Rinzler" (from Tron: Legacy) was released, and premiered on Dancing Astronaut. On 30 March 2018, a remix of "Radioactivity" by Kraftwerk was released on all platforms. His debut extended play, Sentience, which comprises four tracks was released on August 24, 2018, through Zeds Dead' label, Deadbeats.

1788-L performed his first live show on July, 2018 in Los Angeles, California.

Discography

Extended plays

Singles

Other appearances

Remixes

References

Electronic musicians
Living people
Year of birth missing (living people)